Kathleen Mary Gertrude Todd (19 November 1898 – 21 March 1968) was a pioneering New Zealand child psychiatrist.

Early life
Kathleen Todd was born in 1898 in Heriot, Otago. She was one of the seven children of Charles Todd, an auctioneer and stock and station agent who founded the firm that became the Todd Corporation, and his wife Mary Hegarty. Kathleen was educated at St Dominic's College, Dunedin of which she was dux in 1915. She proceeded to the University of Otago to study medicine graduating (M.B.Ch.B) UNZ in 1923. She obtained junior medical positions, but for women doctors professional options were limited in New Zealand at that time. She carried out further studies in Vienna and London hospitals and did further courses in Boston and Oakland, California in psychological medicine. She obtained a Diploma in Psychological Medicine (DPM) in London.

Career
Todd became a Member of the British Psychological Society in 1938 and a Fellow in 1942; a Fellow of the Royal Society of Medicine in 1941; a Member of the Royal Medico Psychological Association in 1943.

Kathleen Todd used her considerable means to establish Fellowships to assist young psychiatrists in postgraduate study in London, one per year from 1962. She intended the money, GBP600 ($24,000 in 2012) per year for three years, to pay for a personal psychoanalysis and assist with a broad experience of European culture. She stipulated that Kathleen Todd Fellows return to New Zealand to private practice. Brian Barraclough MD FRACP was the first Fellow 1962-64.

Personal life
Kathleen Todd shared in the considerable wealth of the Todd family as her father made a point of spreading shareholdings amongst his children and to his wife (although the males got bigger parcels than the females). When Kathleen Todd and Moyra Todd were living in Hamstead their well-ordered household included servants and "Brett the butler". She died at home on 21 March 1968.

References

Bibliography

New Zealand psychiatrists
New Zealand people of Irish descent
New Zealand people of Scottish descent
People educated at Trinity Catholic College, Dunedin
University of Otago alumni
1898 births
1968 deaths
Kathleen
New Zealand women psychiatrists
20th-century New Zealand medical doctors
People from Heriot, New Zealand